Varinder Singh may refer to:

 Varinder Singh (field hockey) (1947–2022), Indian field hockey player
 Varinder Singh (soldier) (1955–2012), Indian soldier